Airdrie Aerodrome  is a registered aerodrome located  southeast of Airdrie, Alberta, Canada.

History
The aerodrome was used as the primary relief landing field for No. 3 Service Flying Training School (SFTS) during World War II. No. 3 SFTS was based out of RCAF Station Lincoln Park in Calgary.

Aerodrome information
The aerodrome was listed with three runways as follows:

Airdrie Regional Airshow
The Airdrie Regional Airshow was held here every two years. Displays such as the Snowbirds, Viper West and CF-18 Demonstration Team were shown.

Due to the opening of runway 17L/35R at Calgary International Airport in 2014, the airshow was relocated to the Calgary/Springbank Airport, becoming Wings over Springbank.

See also
List of airports in the Calgary area

References

External links
Airdrie Airport - A Brief History
Airdrie Flying Club
Page about this airport on COPA's Places to Fly airport directory

Airdrie, Alberta
Registered aerodromes in Alberta
Airports of the British Commonwealth Air Training Plan